Eucryphia moorei, commonly known as pinkwood, plumwood, or eastern leatherwood is a tree found in southeastern New South Wales, Australia. It also occurs just over the border at the Howe Range in Victoria. Pinkwood is the dominant tree species of cool-temperate rainforests of southeastern NSW. Young plants often grow as hemiepiphytes.

Description
Eucryphia moorei can grow to 30 metres in height. Leaves are pinnate, mostly 5–15 cm long, with usually 5–13 leaflets but they are often reduced to 3 on flowering branches. Leaflets are oblong, 1–7 cm long, mostly 5–15 mm wide, margins are entire, lamina is leathery, upper surface is dark green and ± glabrous, lower surface is white-tomentose; petiole is 10–30 mm long; lateral leaflets are sessile.

Gallery

References

moorei
Flora of New South Wales
Oxalidales of Australia
Trees of Australia
Taxa named by Ferdinand von Mueller